The Nichols Satinet Mill Site, also known as Site No. 97-14, is an historic industrial archeological site in Newtown, Connecticut.  It was listed on the National Register of Historic Places in 1996.

It is also known as the Orchard Hill Mill Site and is the mill within the Orchard Hill Nature Center.  The site was listed on the National Register more than a decade after local residents created the nature center.

The site is owned by the town of Newtown.  Listing was believed to increase the chance that it could become the focus of a dig by state archeologists.  The site was owned by the Nichols family in the 1760s.  The property includes two old dam and mill sites.  The second-built dam on the site is a -high, -long structure made of granite blocks.

See also

National Register of Historic Places listings in Fairfield County, Connecticut

References

National Register of Historic Places in Fairfield County, Connecticut
Archaeological sites in Fairfield County, Connecticut
Newtown, Connecticut
Archaeological sites on the National Register of Historic Places in Connecticut